Clint Ford (born January 27, 1976) is an American screenwriter, actor, voice-over artist, and novelist. He is best known for his portrayal as the Klingon M'ven, of the Great House of Martok, in the video game, Star Trek Online. He is also known for his work in the American dubs of Japanese anime cartoon series, such as Yû yû hakusho, Blue Gender, and Dragon Ball Z.

Ford was born in Fort Worth and was raised in Bedford, Texas, and Longview, Texas. He studied Theatre Arts and Creative Writing at Western Kentucky University in Bowling Green, Kentucky. Upon his return to Texas, he lent his writing and vocal talents to the Radio Disney Network for several years.

His first on-camera appearance was in the 1995 television series, The Hot Plate. His film debut was in the 2000 film, Stingray.

Over the years, he has written several scripts for film and television.

In 2013, Ford published his first novel, Cope.

Ford is also known as the voice of several well-known novelty items released by Gemmy Industries between 2004 and 2007, such as The Butler, Doctor Shivers, The All-Seeing Zultan, and "Buck, the Animated Trophy".

In 2018, Ford wrote the prequel screenplay for the 13th installment of the Friday the 13th franchise, reported in November 2018 by Ain't It Cool News.

He currently resides in North Richland Hills, Texas with his wife and four children.

Filmography

Television

Film

Animation

Video games

Bibliography

References

External links
 Official site
 
 Ford, Clint (2012). Cope at Amazon.com
 Where To Pee on a Pirate Ship, narrated by Clint Ford, at Audible.com

American male television actors
American male voice actors
Audiobook narrators
People from Tarrant County, Texas
Male actors from Fort Worth, Texas
20th-century American writers
21st-century American male actors
21st-century American writers
1976 births
20th-century American male actors
Living people
Western Kentucky University alumni
People from North Richland Hills, Texas
American male film actors
American male video game actors
20th-century American male writers